Cox Creek is a stream in Lauderdale County, in the U.S. state of Alabama, that flows through the northern portions of the city of Florence.

Cox Creek was probably named for Zachariah Cox, a land agent.

See also
List of rivers of Alabama

References

Rivers of Lauderdale County, Alabama
Rivers of Alabama